Bhadrak Lok Sabha constituency is one of the 21 Lok Sabha (parliamentary) constituencies in Odisha state in eastern India.

Assembly segments
Assembly Constituencies which constitute this Parliamentary Constituency, after delimitation of Parliamentary Constituencies and Legislative Assembly Constituencies of 2008 are:

Members of Parliament
2019: Manju Lata Mandal, Biju Janata Dal
2014: Arjun Charan Sethi, Biju Janata Dal, later Bharatiya Janata Party (2019)
2009: Arjun Charan Sethi, Biju Janata Dal
2004: Arjun Charan Sethi, Biju Janata Dal
1999: Arjun Charan Sethi, Biju Janata Dal
1998: Arjun Charan Sethi, Biju Janata Dal
1996: Muralidhar Jena, Indian National Congress
1991: Arjun Charan Sethi, Janata Dal
1989: Mangaraj Malik, Janata Dal
1984: Ananta Prasad Sethi, Indian National Congress
1980: Arjun Charan Sethi, Indian National Congress (I)
1977: Bairagi Jena, Janata Party
1971: Arjun Charan Sethi, Indian National Congress
1967: Dharanidhar Jena, Swatantra Party
1962: Kanhu Charan Jena, Indian National Congress
1957: Kanhu Charan Jena, Indian National Congress
1951: Kanhu Charan Jena, Indian National Congress

Election Result

2019 Election Result

2014 Election
In 2014 election, Biju Janata Dal candidate Arjun Charan Sethi defeated Indian National Congress candidate Sangram Keshari Jena by a margin of 1,79,359 votes.

General Election 2009

References

Lok Sabha constituencies in Odisha
Bhadrak district
Balasore district